Radim Ostrčil (born January 15, 1989) is a Czech former professional ice hockey defenseman. He most recently played with VHK Vsetín in the Second National Hockey League (Czech.3).

He has formerly played with HC Vsetín and HC Olomouc. While formerly enjoying a spell in the Czech Extraliga with HC Kometa Brno. He was selected by the Boston Bruins in the 6th round (169th overall) of the 2007 NHL Entry Draft. After playing the following 2007–08 season of major junior hockey with the Ottawa 67's in the Ontario Hockey League, and with a contract with the Bruins unattainable, he opted to return to the Czech Republic.

References

External links 

 

1989 births
Living people
Boston Bruins draft picks
Czech ice hockey defencemen
HC Kometa Brno players
HC Olomouc players
Ottawa 67's players
VHK Vsetín players
People from Vsetín
MsHK Žilina players
Sportspeople from the Zlín Region
Czech expatriate ice hockey players in Canada
Czech expatriate ice hockey players in Slovakia